In mathematics, a Colombeau algebra is an algebra of a certain kind containing the space of Schwartz distributions. While in classical distribution theory a general multiplication of distributions is not possible, Colombeau algebras provide a rigorous framework for this.

Such a multiplication of distributions has long been believed to be impossible because of L. Schwartz' impossibility result, which basically states that there cannot be a differential algebra containing the space of distributions and preserving the product of continuous functions. However, if one only wants to preserve the product of smooth functions instead such a construction becomes possible, as demonstrated first by Colombeau.

As a mathematical tool, Colombeau algebras can be said to combine a treatment of singularities, differentiation and nonlinear operations in one framework, lifting the limitations of distribution theory. These algebras have found numerous applications in the fields of partial differential equations, geophysics, microlocal analysis and general relativity so far.

Colombeau algebras are named after French mathematician Jean François Colombeau.

Schwartz' impossibility result 

Attempting to embed the space  of distributions on  into an associative algebra , the following requirements seem to be natural:

However, L. Schwartz' result implies that these requirements cannot hold simultaneously. While this result has often been interpreted as saying that a general multiplication of distributions is not possible, in fact it only states that one cannot unrestrictedly combine differentiation, multiplication of continuous functions and the presence of singular objects like the Dirac delta.

Basic idea 

The Colombeau Algebra is defined as the quotient algebra

of smooth functions on 

The ideal  of negligible functions is defined in the same way but with the partial derivatives instead bounded by O(ε+N) for all N > 0.

Embedding of distributions 
The space(s) of Schwartz distributions can be embedded into the simplified algebra by (component-wise) convolution with any element of the algebra having as representative a δ-net, i.e. a family of smooth functions  such that  in  D'  as ε → 0.

This embedding is non-canonical, because it depends on the choice of the δ-net. However, there are versions of Colombeau algebras (so called full algebras) which allow for canonical embeddings of distributions. A well known full version is obtained by adding the mollifiers as second indexing set.

See also 
 Generalized function

Notes

References 
 Colombeau, J. F., New Generalized Functions and Multiplication of the Distributions. North Holland, Amsterdam, 1984.
 Colombeau, J. F., Elementary introduction to new generalized functions. North-Holland, Amsterdam, 1985.
 Nedeljkov, M., Pilipović, S., Scarpalezos, D., Linear Theory of Colombeau's Generalized Functions, Addison Wesley, Longman, 1998.
 Grosser, M., Kunzinger, M., Oberguggenberger, M., Steinbauer, R.; Geometric Theory of Generalized Functions with Applications to General Relativity, Springer Series Mathematics and Its Applications, Vol. 537, 2002; .

Smooth functions
Functional analysis
Algebras
Schwartz distributions